Frog & Snail (formerly Chez Machin) is a French restaurant in Portland, Oregon.

Description 

Frog & Snail, established as Chez Machin, is a crêperie in southeast Portland's Sunnyside neighborhood. In 2004, Katie Shimer of the Portland Mercury described Chez Machin as a "small, welcoming restaurant" with a "wide open front door, red and white checked tablecloths, and calming French bistro atmosphere". She also said the tables "offer a comfortable distance, so you can feel free to propose marriage or break up with someone, without everyone eavesdropping". In 2011, Allison Jones of Portland Monthly wrote, "The space is tiny, cozy, and very French, with a great back patio that is a welcome respite from busy Hawthorne." The restaurant's exterior features a small red replica of the Eiffel Tower and the interior has a mural by Gus Van Sant.

The French menu includes savory and sweet varieties of buckwheat crêpes, including a gluten-free option. The La Bèchamel has black forest ham, Swiss cheese, mushrooms, scallions, and béchamel sauce, and the L’Allemande has bacon, potatoes, caramelized onions, and roasted red pepper coulis. The Classic has Nutella, banana, and crumbled graham crackers. Savory varieties include the BBQ, the Grilled Cheese, and the German, which has  potatoes au gratin, caramelized onion jam, bacon, scallions, and homemade crème fraîche. The menu has also included quiches and French onion soup. Salads have included the Salade Regim (spring greens, green apple, toasted almonds, gorgonzola, and vinaigrette) and the Salade Bistro, which has bay shrimp, avocado, hard-boiled egg, and Dijon vinaigrette. Drink options include coffee and wine.

History 

Gus Van Sant painted the mural in 1986, when the building housed a Macheezmo Mouse restaurant. In 2007,  Eric John Kaiser celebrated the release of his debut album L'Odyssée by performing at Chez Machin.

The restaurant was burglarized in 2017. In 2020, during the COVID-19 pandemic, Chad Bernard changed the restaurant's name to Frog & Snail and overhauled the menu.

Reception 
The Portland Mercury Katie Shimer wrote in 2004: 

In 2011, Portland Monthly Allison Jones wrote, "Prices are higher here, but the sit-down cafe experience is top-notch." In 2017, Carrie Uffindell of Eater Portland included Chez Machin in a list of "the best creperies and crepe-centric cafés throughout the city" and said the restaurant is among Portland's "more traditional French-rooted options".

See also 

 List of French restaurants

References

External links 

 
 Chez Machin at Zomato

French restaurants in Portland, Oregon
Sunnyside, Portland, Oregon